Scolelepis is a genus of annelids belonging to the family Spionidae.

The genus has cosmopolitan distribution.

Species:

Scolelepis acuta 
Scolelepis agilis 
Scolelepis aitutakii 
Scolelepis alaskensis 
Scolelepis alisonae 
Scolelepis anakenae 
Scolelepis andradei 
Scolelepis angulata 
Scolelepis antipoda 
Scolelepis balihaiensis 
Scolelepis bifida 
Scolelepis blakei 
Scolelepis bonnieri 
Scolelepis bousfieldi 
Scolelepis branchia 
Scolelepis brevibranchia 
Scolelepis bullibranchia 
Scolelepis burkovskii 
Scolelepis cantabra 
Scolelepis carrascoi 
Scolelepis carunculata 
Scolelepis chilensis 
Scolelepis cirratulus
Scolelepis crenulata 
Scolelepis daphoinos 
Scolelepis denmarkensis 
Scolelepis dicha 
Scolelepis edmondsi 
Scolelepis eltaninae 
Scolelepis eltaninae 
Scolelepis faughni 
Scolelepis finmarchicus 
Scolelepis foliosa 
Scolelepis foliosa 
Scolelepis fulginosa
Scolelepis gaucha 
Scolelepis geniculata 
Scolelepis gilchristi 
Scolelepis globosa 
Scolelepis goodbodyi 
Scolelepis hutchingsae 
Scolelepis inversa 
Scolelepis knightjonesi 
Scolelepis korsuni 
Scolelepis kudenovi 
Scolelepis laciniata 
Scolelepis lamellata 
Scolelepis lamellicincta 
Scolelepis laonicola 
Scolelepis lefebvrei 
Scolelepis lighti 
Scolelepis lingulata 
Scolelepis longirostris 
Scolelepis maculata
Scolelepis magnicornuta 
Scolelepis magnus 
Scolelepis marionis 
Scolelepis melasma 
Scolelepis minuta 
Scolelepis neglecta 
Scolelepis occipitalis 
Scolelepis oligobranchia 
Scolelepis papillosa 
Scolelepis perrieri 
Scolelepis pettiboneae 
Scolelepis phyllobranchia 
Scolelepis planata 
Scolelepis precirriseta 
Scolelepis quadridentata 
Scolelepis quinquedentata 
Scolelepis sagittaria 
Scolelepis squamata 
Scolelepis texana 
Scolelepis towra 
Scolelepis tridentata 
Scolelepis variegata 
Scolelepis vazaha 
Scolelepis victoriensis 
Scolelepis villosivaina 
Scolelepis viridis 
Scolelepis vossae 
Scolelepis vulgaris 
Scolelepis westoni 
Scolelepis williami 
Scolelepis yamaguchii

References

Canalipalpata
Annelid genera